Frank J. Donatelli (born July 4, 1949) is a Republican Party political consultant and lawyer.

Biography
Frank was born on July 4, 1949 in Pennsylvania to Herman and Philomena Donatelli (Paladino). Frank is married to Rebecca Black Donatelli since 1978 and they have one daughter. He is a graduate of the University of Pittsburgh and American University Law School, Donatelli served in various positions in the Reagan administration including Assistant to the President for Political and Intergovernmental Affairs and Deputy Assistant to the President for Public Liaison. He worked on White House Chief of Staff James Baker's team that negotiated the 1984 presidential debates and served as a Regional Political Director for Ronald Reagan. He was also active in the presidential campaigns of George H. W. Bush in 1988 and 1992 and was a senior advisor to Bob Dole during the 1996 presidential election.

In 1992, Donatelli served as chairman of the Christopher Columbus Quincentennial Commission which celebrated the 500th anniversary of Christopher Columbus' arrival in the New World. He is Executive Vice President and Director of Federal Public Affairs of McGuireWoods Consulting as well as counsel to McGuireWoods. He also serves as secretary and treasurer of the board of the Young America's Foundation, is chairman of the Reagan Ranch Board of Governors and was selected by John McCain to serve as the deputy chairman of the Republican National Committee under Mike Duncan during the 2008 presidential election. Afterwards, in March 2009, he was chosen to become chairman of GOPAC, succeeding Michael Steele who became chairman of the RNC.

References

External links

Biography on GOPAC website
Biography on Young America's Foundation website

1949 births
American lawyers
American people of Italian descent
American political consultants
Assistants to the President of the United States
Living people
Pennsylvania Republicans
Reagan administration personnel
University of Pittsburgh alumni
Washington College of Law alumni
McGuireWoods people